Ita Ever (born Ilse Ever; 1 April 1931) is an Estonian film, radio, theatre and television actress. She is widely regarded as a Grand Old Lady of Estonian theatre.

She began her career in 1953 as a stage actress and has appeared in numerous Estonian and Russian film productions. She was formerly married to Estonian actor Eino Baskin and is the mother of director/actor Roman Baskin.

In 1983, she starred as Miss Marple in Secret of the Blackbirds (Tayna chyornykh drozdov), the Russian language film adaption of Agatha Christie's novel A Pocket Full of Rye.

She has appeared in stage and film productions based on the works of: Oskar Luts, A. H. Tammsaare, Mats Traat, Agatha Christie, Nikolai Gogol, William Shakespeare, John Steinbeck, Henrik Ibsen and Anton Chekhov.

References

Further reading
Kilumets, Margit. Ita Ever Elu suuruses. Ajakirjade Kirjastus (2006);

External links

Photograph of Ita Ever
Ema ja poeg koos laval/Jaanus Kulli, Õhtuleht
Kunksmoor paneb homme oma nõiapaja keema / Kristi Vainküla, Õhtuleht
VE: Ever, Ita - Eesti teatrilava grand old lady

1931 births
Living people
Estonian stage actresses
Estonian film actresses
Estonian television actresses
Estonian radio actresses
People from Paide
20th-century Estonian actresses
Recipients of the Order of the White Star, 3rd Class